Hexoprenaline is a selective β2 adrenergic receptor agonist used in the treatment of asthma. Hexoprenaline is also used in some countries (such as Russia and Switzerland) as a tocolytic agent (i.e., labor suppressant), with the most common trade name being Gynipral. It is not approved by the United States Food and Drug Administration.

Contraindications
When used as a tocolytic, hexoprenaline is contraindicated in:
 Hyperthyroidism
 Cardiovascular diseases, e.g. cardiac arrhythmias, tachycardia, myocarditis, mitral valve disease and aortic stenosis
 Ischemic heart disease
 Hypertension
 Angle-closure glaucoma
 Placental abruption, vaginal bleeding and inflammatory diseases of internal genitalia (such as endometritis)
 Shock
 First trimester of pregnancy
 Breastfeeding

It should be used with caution in people with gestational diabetes.

Drug-drug interactions
When concomitantly administered:
 Beta blockers reduce or neutralize therapeutic effects of hexoprenaline
 Methylxanthines (caffeine, theobromine, theophylline) increase its action
 General anaesthetics (e.g., halothane) and adrenergic receptor agonists may increase the risk of cardiovascular side effects, such as arrhythmia

Hexoprenaline is contraindicated for use with monoamine oxidase inhibitors (MAOIs), tricyclic antidepressant (TCAs), ergot alkaloids, and dihydrotachysterol.

References 

Antiasthmatic drugs
Beta-adrenergic agonists
Catecholamines
Tocolytics
Phenylethanolamines